My Testimony of Redemption is the sixth and final studio album by rapper Bushwick Bill released on November 17, 2009.

The album is a big change from the hardcore horrorcore and gangster themes of his previous solo albums and work with The Geto Boys, instead emphasizing autobiographical lyrics about Bushwick Bill's conversion to Christianity. It is his only work that did not get a Parental Advisory label.

Track listing 
 Intro
 Takin' It Back
 Testimony of Redemption
 Goin' to the River (feat. Von Won)
 Calling to You (feat. Bruce Bang)
 God's Side Is the Best Side
 Praise of a Good Woman
 Praise God for You (feat. Bruce Bang)
 Guardian Angel (feat. Mississippi Boys)
 Know What You Might Think (feat. Von Won, Icece and Ras)
 God Heals the Pain (feat. Von Won)
 Thorn in My Side (feat. Bless'T and Tre9)
 Life Is a Beautiful Struggle (feat. S.O.M.)
 Spiritual Warfare
 Work It Out (feat. AFC and Gifted Da Flamethrowa)
 No More Child's Play (feat. Atonement)
 Renewed Mind
 Takin' It Back [Remix]

Reception
Critic Alex Henderson of AllMusic described the album as an "uneven" departure from Bushwick Bill's violent and sexually explicit earlier work, but saved in part by an emphasis on introspective lyrics that examine his troubled life.

References 

2009 albums
Bushwick Bill albums
Christian hip hop albums